S. R. Prabhu is an Indian film producer. During his tenure at Studio Green (2010–13), he has produced 10 Tamil films and distributed 16 films in Tamil and Telugu. Later he founded Dream Warrior Pictures, a film production company in which his brother S. R. Prakashbabu has become partner in 2014. He is also a partner in Potential Studios, which is another film production company. S. R. Prabhu is a relative of the veteran actor Sivakumar and cousin of actors Suriya and Karthi.

Career

Studio Green (2010-2013) 
While at Studio Green, they produced Naan Mahaan Alla, starring Karthi and Kajal Agarwal, followed by Siruthai, starring Karthi and Tamannaah Bhatia. Simultaneously, they distributed Yamudu (Telugu version of Singam) and Aawara (Telugu version of Paiyaa). In 2012, he started venturing into small budget films by acquiring  Attakathi and Kumki. In 2013, they produced and distributed Alex Pandian, starring Karthi and distributed  Kedi Billa Killadi Ranga. They also distributed Soodhu Kavvum, which opened to highly positive critical reaction. He produced All in All Azhagu Raja (2013), Biriyani (2013), Madras (2014) and Komban (2015), all starred by Karthi.

Dream Warrior Pictures (2014-present) 
S.R. Prabhu, along with his brother S.R. Prakashbabu, founded a new production company called Dream Warrior Pictures. They started their next production titled Kaashmora (2016), which was to be a high budget film in Karthi's career. Karthi, Nayanthara, Sri Divya and Vivek are the protagonists in Kaashmora. This movie turns out to be a horror comedy flick, directed by Gokul, whose previous movie was Idharkuthane Aasaipattai Balakumara and the music is composed by Santhosh Narayanan. Kaashmora involved huge VFX work with CG footage amounting to nearly 70 mins.

His next project was titled Joker (2016), directed by Raju Murugan, whose previous film was Cuckoo. Guru Somasundaram is the protagonist of the movie Joker. This movie emphasises the necessity of toilets for all rural homes. Even the Indian Prime Minister Narendra Modi has addressed this issue. Hence, medias are asking the Prime Minister to watch the film. In the movie, the protagonist thinks himself the President of India. "Joker explores different side of me", says Guru Somasundaram. The Superstar of Tamil Cinema Padma Vibhushan Rajnikath praised the Joker team. Joker won the Tamil Film competition of 14th Chennai International Film Festival held in January 2017 at Chennai. Also, the film won a few more awards for Best Dialogues and Best Production, which is conferred by Ananda Vikatan.

Simultaneously, the Company started producing another movie titled Aruvi, which is an Eco-Social Drama, directed by Arun Prabhu. The Team had been hunting for a lead artist through all social medias. Aruvi made its International Premiere at Shanghai International Film Festival in June 2016. Producer S.R. Prabhu says: "We are so much proud that Aruvi has become one of the best films produced under our banner". Alongside Aruvi, Kootathil Orthan is also started, which is directed by Gnanavel, his debut movie. Ashok Selvan and Priya Anand are doing the lead roles in this movie. After Kaashmora, Aruvi and Kootathil Oruthan, the production house is producing Karthi's 16th movie titled Theeran Adhigaaram Ondru and Suriya's 36th movie, cast and crew is to be finalised for both the projects. Also, Dream Warrior Pictures is eyeing for an International co-production for their project The Sunshine, which is written by Leena Manimekalai and Antonythasan Jesuthasan, to be directed by Leena Manimekalai. The Sunshine is about a young refugee (Armstrong) who flees from the war-torn northern Sri Lanka and embarks on a perilous journey through India, Nepal and Thailand towards an uncertain destination, leaving his childhood sweetheart on the shores that foam blood. The Sunshine was presented in the 2016 Film Bazaar co-production market.

Potential Studios (2014-present) 
Under Potential Studios, his first movie was Maya (2015), starring Aari and Nayantara, directed by Ashwin Saravanan, which is his debut movie. The movie won many awards for Nayantara in various events. The movie has simultaneous release in Telugu as Mayuri. after Maya, Potential Studio's next title was Maanagaram (2017), directed by Lokesh Kanagaraj, starred by Sundeep Kishan, Sri and Regina Cassandra. Maanagaram had its theatrical release on 10 March 2017. After Maya and Maanagaram, Monster is the third film from this production house, starring S. J. Suryah, Priya Bhavani Shankar, Karunakaran and directed by Nelson Venkatesan.

Tamil Nadu Film Producers Council (2017-2019) 
He was elected as Treasurer in the Tamil Film Producers Council election, which was held on 2 April 2017.

Filmography

Dream Warrior Pictures (as Producer)

Potential Studios (as Producer)

Studio Green (as Producer)

References

External links 
 
 

Tamil film producers
Film producers from Tamil Nadu
Living people
Telugu film producers
Indian film distributors
People from Erode district
Year of birth missing (living people)